Rear Admiral (junior grade) Ralph Ndabambi is a retired South African naval officer.

He joined the armed wing of the ANC, Umkhonto we Sizwe in 1981 in Angola and was later selected to undergo naval training at Kirov College in the USSR. He returned to Tanzania in 1991 and became involved in negotiations between the ANC and the South African Government.

He joined the South African Navy in 1994. In 2005 he was promoted to Rear Admiral (junior grade) and appointed Director Naval Transformation. In 2006 he moved to Beijing as Defence Attache. He was appointed Director Fleet Human Resources from 1 December 2009 before being appointed as Director Naval Reserves in January 2012.

References

South African admirals
Living people
Year of birth missing (living people)